Strubiny  is a village in the administrative district of Gmina Zakroczym, within Nowy Dwór County, Masovian Voivodeship, in east-central Poland.

References

Villages in Nowy Dwór Mazowiecki County